Ian Lockie Michael (1915–2014) was a British academic who was the founding Vice-Chancellor of the University of Malawi.

Biography

Ian Michael was born in Kelso in Scotland in 1915. After becoming the first Professor of Education at the University of Khartoum, Dr Michael was appointed Vice-Chancellor of the University of Malawi in 1964. In 1973 he became Deputy Director of the University of London Institute of Education before retiring in 1978.

Michael was the author of several books on the teaching of English.

References

Academic staff of the University of Malawi
1915 births
2014 deaths
British expatriate academics
Vice-chancellors of universities in Malawi
Academic staff of the University of Khartoum